CBC News: The Scene is a Canadian entertainment news program on CBC Television and CBC Newsworld. It airs a two-minute weekday wrap on CBC News Network and local CBC newscasts, and a half-hour Weekend Scene edition airs on Fridays, Saturdays and Sundays on CBC News Network.

The show is hosted by journalist Jelena Adzic.

Other regular cast
 Sandra Abma, national arts reporter
 Mio Adilman, online commentator
 Laura Thompson, music reviewer

External links
 CBC News: The Scene Website

CBC News Network original programming